Caleb Rodney Layton III (July 4, 1907 – May 6, 1988) was a United States district judge of the United States District Court for the District of Delaware.

Education and career

Born in Georgetown, Delaware, Layton received an Artium Baccalaureus degree from Princeton University in 1930 and then attended the University of Pennsylvania Law School. He was a Judge of the Superior Court of Delaware from 1947 to 1957.

Federal judicial service

Layton was nominated by President Dwight D. Eisenhower on March 25, 1957, to a seat on the United States District Court for the District of Delaware vacated by Judge Richard Seymour Rodney. He was confirmed by the United States Senate on April 16, 1957, and received his commission the next day. He assumed senior status due to a certified disability on April 26, 1968. His service terminated on May 6, 1988, due to his death.

References

Sources
 

Delaware Superior Court judges
University of Pennsylvania Law School alumni
Judges of the United States District Court for the District of Delaware
United States district court judges appointed by Dwight D. Eisenhower
20th-century American judges
Princeton University alumni
1907 births
1988 deaths
20th-century American lawyers
People from Georgetown, Delaware